Paulo Sérgio Betanin (born 10 January 1986), more commonly known as Paulinho, is a Brazilian professional footballer who plays as a forward. He also holds an Italian passport through Venetian descent.

Club career
Paulinho started his career at Esporte Clube Juventude. He was signed by Livorno on loan in January 2005. He made his Serie A debut on 17 April 2005 against Fiorentina.

In 2007–08 season he left for Serie B side Grosseto and in 2009–10 season left for Sorrento. His loan was extended in July 2010. With Livorno, he won promotion to Serie A in 2009, only a year after the team had been relegated from the same division. Livrono promoted back to Serie A in 2013. However, the club relegated again in 2014.

In 2014 Paulinho was sold to Al-Arabi for €8 million (€7.6 million to Livorno and €400,000 as solidarity contribution.)

On 23 August 2017, Paulinho returned to Italy for Cremonese. On 1 February 2019, he was released from his Cremonese contract by mutual consent.

International career
Paulinho was capped for the Brazilian under-20 team at the 2005 South American Youth Championship. He played four matches and scored once.

Career statistics

References

External links
 
 
 Football.it Profile  

1986 births
Living people
Brazilian footballers
Brazil under-20 international footballers
Serie A players
Serie B players
Qatar Stars League players
Esporte Clube Juventude players
U.S. Livorno 1915 players
F.C. Grosseto S.S.D. players
A.S.D. Sorrento players
Al-Arabi SC (Qatar) players
U.S. Cremonese players
Association football forwards
Brazilian expatriate footballers
Expatriate footballers in Italy
Brazilian expatriate sportspeople in Italy
People from Caxias do Sul
Brazilian people of Italian descent
Citizens of Italy through descent
Brazilian people of Venetian descent
Sportspeople from Rio Grande do Sul